is a holiday in the tradition of Japanese Jodo Shinshu Buddhism that observes the memorial of its founder, Shinran Shonin.  Depending on whether the old Japanese lunar calendar is used, or the western Gregorian calendar, typically this holiday is observed either in around 28 November (as in the Higashi Honganji) or early January from the 9th to the 16th (as in the Nishi Honganji) respectively.  This holiday is among the most important observed in the Jodo Shinshu tradition.  The observance began after Shinran's daughter, Kakushinni carried on administration of Shinran's mausoleum, as did her descendants, who ultimately became the Monshu of Jodo Shinshu. In the word hōonkō; 'hōon' means "return of gratitude" and 'ko' means "to clarify the meaning of" or "gathering"'.

A typical service for Hoonko will consist of reciting Shinran's hymn, the Shoshinge, and a reading from the life of Shinran.  Followers will sometimes observe a strict diet that day, preferring to eat shōjin ryōri or "Buddhist cuisine", though this is strictly optional.  Temple services will often serve Buddhist cuisine after service including vegetarian ozōni, adzuki and mochi.

Buddhist holidays
January observances
November observances
Shinran
Observances set by the traditional Japanese calendar
Buddhist festivals in Japan